Nicolae Berechet (April 16, 1915 in Dioşti, Dolj County – August 14, 1936 in Berlin) was a Romanian boxer who competed in the 1936 Summer Olympics.

On August 11, 1936 he was eliminated in the first round of the featherweight class after losing his fight to Evald Seeberg.  A few days after the match he died mysteriously of blood poisoning and was buried in Berlin.

References

External links
Nicolae Berechet's profile at Sports Reference.com

1915 births
1936 deaths
Featherweight boxers
Olympic boxers of Romania
Boxers at the 1936 Summer Olympics
Olympic deaths
Romanian male boxers
People from Dolj County